Berker Güven (born 7 September 1994) is a Turkish actor.

He made his cinematic debut in 2017 with a role in the movie Babam alongside Çetin Tekindor and Melisa Şenolsun. He started his career in television with his role as Aleksi in Vatanım Sensin, and further rose to prominence by his performance in Zalim İstanbul as Nedim.

At the 22nd Sadri Alışık Theater and Cinema Actors Awards, he received the Outstanding Young Actor Award for his performance in the theater play Yen.

In November 2019, he was given the Best Drama Actor of the Year award at the Turkey– Azerbaijan Brotherhood Awards.

Filmography

References

External links 
 
 

Living people
1994 births
Turkish male stage actors
Turkish male film actors
Turkish male television actors